"Right Light Rise" is the seventh single released by Japanese singer and cellist Kanon Wakeshima. The song was used as an ending theme for the first season of the Is It Wrong to Try to Pick Up Girls in a Dungeon? anime television series. The song peaked at number 50 on the Oricon Singles Chart and stayed on the chart for six weeks.

Track listing

Personnel
 Kanon Wakeshima – Vocals, Cello, Piano, Lyrics

References 

2015 singles
2015 songs
Kanon Wakeshima songs
Warner Music Japan singles
Anime songs